In computer algebra, an Ore algebra is a special kind of iterated Ore extension that can be used to represent linear functional operators, including linear differential and/or recurrence operators. The concept is named after Øystein Ore.

Definition 

Let  be a (commutative) field and  be a commutative polynomial ring (with  when ).

Properties 

Ore algebras satisfy the Ore condition, and thus can be embedded in a (skew) field of fractions.

The constraint of commutation in the definition makes Ore algebras have a non-commutative generalization theory of Gröbner basis for their left ideals.

References

Computer algebra
Ring theory